Due per tre is an Italian sitcom.

Cast
Johnny Dorelli as Giorgio Antonioli
Loretta Goggi as  Elena Antonioli
 Marta Forghieri as  Martina Antonioli
 Margherita Lombardo as  Niki Antonioli
 Alessandro Sacco as  Leo Antonioli

See also
List of Italian television series

External links
 

Italian television series
1997 Italian television series debuts
1999 Italian television series endings
Canale 5 original programming